Mirebeau (Poitevin: Mirebea) is a commune in the Vienne department, in the region of Nouvelle-Aquitaine, western France.

History
Fulk Nerra (970-1040), Count of Anjou conquered Mirebeau and built a castle there. His son, Geoffrey of Anjou, defeated William VI, Duke of Aquitaine and Count of Poitou at the battle of Moncontour on September 20, 1033, and from that date Mirebeau belonged to the county of Anjou until 1790, and the replacement of the old provinces by departements during the French revolution.

In mid-July 1202, Queen Eleanor of Aquitaine was blocked there by the army of the King of France commanded by Arthur, Duke of Brittany, a grandson of Eleanor's. The latter took the city, and was about to storm the castle when Eleanor managed to flee, rescued by the arrival of her son John, King of England on August 1. John, attacking from the rear, annihilated Arthur's troops  and captured his nephew, whom he would kill in prison in April 1203 (one of the versions of the death of Arthur). Eleanor, Fair Maid of Brittany sister of Arthur was also supposed to be captured in this battle as well and would never be released.

Demographics

Twin towns
Bassemyam, Burkina Faso
Membrilla, Spain
Regen, Germany
Saint-raymond, Quebec

See also
Communes of the Vienne department

References

Communes of Vienne
Anjou